The Men's shot put event  at the 2004 IAAF World Indoor Championships was held on March 6–7.

Medalists

Results

Qualification
Qualifying performance 20.50 (Q) or 8 best performers (q) advanced to the final.

Final

References
Results

Shot
Shot put at the World Athletics Indoor Championships